The 2005 Welsh Open was a professional ranking snooker tournament that took place between 17 and 23 January 2005 at the Newport Centre in Newport, Wales.

Ronnie O'Sullivan successfully defended his title by beating Stephen Hendry 9–8.

Tournament summary 

Defending champion and World Champion Ronnie O'Sullivan was the number 1 seed. The remaining places were allocated to players based on the world rankings.

Prize fund
The breakdown of prize money for this year is shown below:

Winner: £35,000
Runner-up: £17,500
Semi-final: £8,750
Quarter-final: £6,500
Last 16: £4,275
Last 32: £2,750

Last 48: £1,725
Last 64: £1,325
Highest break: £2,000
Maximum break: £20,000
Total: £225,000

Main draw

Final

Qualifying

Qualifying for the tournament took place at Pontin's in Prestatyn, Wales  between 7 January and 9 January 2005.

Century breaks

Qualifying stage centuries

 143  Alfie Burden
 137, 125, 106, 104  Tom Ford
 133  Jonathan Birch
 128, 110, 108  Ryan Day
 121  Mike Dunn
 113  Stuart Bingham
 110, 100  Robin Hull

 110, 105  Andrew Norman
 105  Gary Wilson
 104  Anthony Hamilton
 103  Ding Junhui
 100  Fergal O'Brien
 100  Neil Robertson
 100  Mark Davis

Televised stage centuries

 146, 133, 131, 127, 126, 114, 110, 102, 102, 101  Ronnie O'Sullivan
 140, 128, 125, 119, 119, 103  Stephen Hendry
 138, 117  Ali Carter
 133  Ken Doherty
 132  Joe Perry
 129  Drew Henry

 123, 108  Peter Ebdon
 120, 100  Marco Fu
 116  Alan McManus
 113, 102  Barry Hawkins
 103  David Gray
 103  Ian McCulloch

References

Welsh Open (snooker)
Welsh Open
Open (snooker)
Welsh Open snooker in Newport
2000s in Cardiff